The 1950 Philadelphia Eagles season was their 18th in the league. The team failed to improve on their previous output of 11–1, winning only six games. The team failed to qualify for the playoffs for the first time in four seasons.

Off Season
The National Football League and the All-America Football Conference came to an agreement. The Baltimore Colts, Cleveland Browns, and San Francisco 49ers would join the older NFL.
The Philadelphia Eagles would meet the Cleveland Browns in a Saturday night game to open the 1950 season in Philadelphia Municipal Stadium instead of Shibe Park for more seating. On September 16, 1950, a crowd of 71,237 turned out in Philadelphia to watch as the Browns won 35–10.

NFL Draft
The 1950 NFL Draft was held on January 20–21, 1950. The former AAFC teams got to pick with the NFL teams and the Detroit Lions won the lottery pick. They used it to select Leon Hart, who played end at the University of Notre Dame. With an 11–1 record in the 1949 season and Cleveland at 9–1–2, the Eagles picked last in each round.

The Eagles first draft pick went to University of Minnesota for football and basketball. He chose and played for the Minneapolis Lakers in the NBA during the 1950 season. He would join the Eagles in 1951 but left the Eagles after two seasons over money to play in Canadian Football League. He would later go into the Canadian Football Hall of Fame in 1983  and the Pro Football Hall of Fame as a coach in 1994.

Player selections
The table shows the Eagles selections and what picks they had that were traded away and the team that ended up with that pick. It is possible the Eagles' pick ended up with this team via another team that the Eagles made a trade with. 
Not shown are acquired picks that the Eagles traded away.

1950 AAFC Dispersal Draft
The NFL and AAFC were rivals for four years. In 1949 it was agreed to allow three teams from the AAFC to join the NFL; there was an AAFC Dispersal Draft of players done. Below are whom the Eagles selected in the draft. 
The National Football League held the dispersal draft on June 2, 1950. The draft order was determined by the order of finish of the 1949 season. Because Green Bay and Baltimore were the weakest teams they were given extra picks: two picks each between rounds 3 and 4, one between rounds 5 and 6, 7 and 8  and between 9 and 10.

Schedule

Roster
(All time List of Philadelphia Eagles players in franchise history)

  +  After name means 1st team selection

Standings

References

Philadelphia Eagles seasons
Philadelphia Eagles
Philadelphia